Neo Universe (May 21, 2000 - March 8, 2021) was a retired Japanese Thoroughbred racehorse and sire. In 2003 he won the Satsuki Shō and the Tokyo Yūshun (Japanese Derby), but was defeated when attempting to complete the Japanese Triple Crown in the Kikuka Shō. He was retired from racing after winning once in 2004 and has become a successful sire of winners.

Background
Neo Universe is a bay horse standing 16.2 hands high with a white star and white socks on his hind feet, bred and raced by the Shadai Farm. He was sired by Sunday Silence, who won the 1989 Kentucky Derby, before retiring to stud in Japan where he was champion sire on thirteen consecutive occasions. Neo Universe's dam was the British-bred mare Pointed Path, making him a close relative of the European Group One winners Helen Street (Irish Oaks) and Shamardal. The colt was named after a song by the Japanese rock band L'Arc-en-Ciel. The colt was sent into training with the veteran Tsutomu Setoguchi, best known for handling the Japanese Horse of the Year Oguri Cap.

Racing career

2002: two-year-old season
Neo Universe began his racing career in November 2002 when he defeated seventeen opponents in a seven furlong maiden race at Kyoto Racecourse. A month later her finished third to Hoshi Commander over nine furlongs in the Chukyo Two-year-old Cup at Chukyo Racecourse.

2003: three-year-old season
Neo Universe began his three-year-old season with five consecutive victories. After winning a minor race at Kyoto in January he was moved up in class and won the Group Three Kisaragi Shō at the same course a month later, beating Silent Deal by half a length. In March he was ridden for the first time by the Italian jockey Mirco Demuro in the Group Two Spring Stakes at Nakayama Racecourse and won by one and a quarter lengths from Sakura President.

On 20 April Neo Universe was made 13/5 favourite for the ten furlong Satsuki Shō (Japanese 2000 Guineas), the first leg of the Japanese Triple Crown. Ridden again by Demuro he was trapped behind other horses and appeared to be in a hopeless position, but accelerated through a narrow gap defeated Sakura President by a head after a "fierce struggle", with the previous season's champion two-year-old Eishin Champ in third place. The winner's next race was the Tokyo Yūshun over one and a half miles at Tokyo Racecourse on 1 June. The race attracted a crowd of 134,000 and Neo Universe was made clear favourite in a field of eighteen. The track was unusually wet and muddy, leading many jockeys to take their horses to the outside in search of better racing ground but Demuro kept the favourite towards the inside rail and won comfortably, beating Zenno Rob Roy by half a length with That's The Plenty three quarters of a length back in third. Demuro, who became the first foreign jockey to win the race, never had to use his whip and described Neo Universe as "unbelievable. If he did any more he'd be flying". Four weeks later, Neo Universe was matched against older horses for the first time when he was one of seventeen runners invited to contest the Takarazuka Kinen at Hanshin Racecourse. He finished fourth behind Hishi Miracle, one place ahead of the Japanese Horse of the Year Symboli Kris S.

After a summer break, Neo Universe returned in autumn in an attempt to complete the Triple Crown in the Kikuka Shō. Despite finishing third to Zenno Rob Roy in his prep race, he was made 1.3/1 favourite in a field of eighteen for the fifteen furlong classic in October. He finished third behind That's The Plenty and Lincoln, beaten three quarters of a length and a neck. On his final appearance of the season he ran in the Japan Cup at Tokyo in November. He finished fourth behind Tap Dance City, That's The Plenty and Symboli Kris S, well ahead of the Breeders' Cup winners Islington and Johar as well as the Cox Plate winner Fields of Omagh.

At the end of the season, Neo Universe was voted Japanese Champion Three-Year-Old Colt.

2004: four-year-old season
Neo Universe remained in training as a four-year-old but made only two appearances. In April he won the Group Two Osaka Cup over ten furlongs, beating the eight-year-old gelding Magnaten by a head. In the following month he was moved up in distance to contest the spring running of the Tennō Shō over two miles and finished unplaced behind Ingrandire. Neo Universe sustained an injury to his right foreleg and was retired from racing at a ceremony at Sapporo Racecourse in September 2004.

Stud record
Neo Universe was retired to become a breeding stallion at the Shadai Stallion Station in Hokkaido. He has become a leading sire in Japan, His first crop of foals produced Logi Universe (Tokyo Yūshun) and Unrivaled (Satsuki Shō) while his second included the Arima Kinen and Dubai World Cup winner Victoire Pisa.

In addition, Neo Universe is also the damsire of 2017 NHK Mile Cup winner Aerolithe, as well as Le Vent Se Leve, winner of the 2018 Champions Cup.

Pedigree

References

Racehorses bred in Japan
Racehorses trained in Japan
2000 racehorse births
2021 racehorse deaths
Thoroughbred family 1-l